The 2016 Bolivarian Beach Games, officially the III Bolivarian Beach Games, is an international multi-sport event that was held from 24 November-3 December 2016 in Iquique, Chile. This was the first time Chile hosted an ODEBO event since becoming a member in 2010.

Host city selection
Iquique was selected over Vargas (Venezuela) as the host city in March 2015.

Sports
Thirteen sports will feature in this edition of Bolivarian Beach Games. Canoeing is added from the previous program.

Participating nations

ODEBO Members
 
  (Host)
 
 
 
  
 

Invited nations

Medal table
Final medal tally

Medalists

Beach handball

Beach rugby

Beach soccer

Beach tennis

Beach volleyball

Canoeing

Open water swimming

Rowing

Sailing

Surfing

Triathlon

Underwater sports

Water skiing

References

External links
Official Website

Beach
Bolivarian Beach Games
2016 in South American sport
Multi-sport events in Chile
International sports competitions hosted by Chile
Bolivarian Beach Games
November 2016 sports events in South America
December 2016 sports events in South America